The year 1999 is the 11th year in the history of Shooto, a mixed martial arts promotion based in the Japan. In 1999 Shooto held 12 events beginning with, Shooto: Devilock Fighters.

Title fights

Events list

Shooto: Devilock Fighters

Shooto: Devilock Fighters was an event held on January 15, 1999, at The Korakuen Hall in Tokyo, Japan.

Results

Shooto: Shooter's Soul

Shooto: Shooter's Soul was an event held on January 27, 1999, at Kitazawa Town Hall in Setagaya, Tokyo, Japan.

Results

Shooto: Renaxis 1

Shooto: Renaxis 1 was an event held on March 28, 1999, at The Korakuen Hall in Tokyo, Japan.

Results

Shooto: Gig '99

Shooto: Gig '99 was an event held on April 9, 1999, at Kitazawa Town Hall in Tokyo, Japan.

Results

Shooto: Shooter's Passion

Shooto: Shooter's Passion was an event held on May 27, 1999, at Kitazawa Town Hall in Setagaya, Tokyo, Japan.

Results

Shooto: 10th Anniversary Event

Shooto: 10th Anniversary Event was an event held on May 29, 1999, at The Yokohama Cultural Gymnasium in Yokohama, Kanagawa, Japan.

Results

Shooto: Renaxis 2

Shooto: Renaxis 2 was an event held on July 16, 1999, at The Korakuen Hall in Tokyo, Japan.

Results

Shooto: Renaxis 3

Shooto: Renaxis 3 was an event held on August 4, 1999, at Kitazawa Town Hall in Setagaya, Tokyo, Japan.

Results

Shooto: Renaxis 4

Shooto: Renaxis 4 was an event held on September 5, 1999, at The Korakuen Hall in Tokyo, Japan.

Results

Shooto: Shooter's Ambition

Shooto: Shooter's Ambition was an event held on October 6, 1999, at Kitazawa Town Hall in Setagaya, Tokyo, Japan.

Results

Shooto: Renaxis 5

Shooto: Renaxis 5 was an event held on October 29, 1999, at The Namihaya Dome in Kadoma, Osaka, Japan.

Results

Shooto: Gateway to the Extremes

Shooto: Gateway to the Extremes was an event held on November 4, 1999, at Kitazawa Town Hall in Setagaya, Tokyo, Japan.

Results

See also 
 Shooto
 List of Shooto champions
 List of Shooto Events

References

Shooto events
1999 in mixed martial arts